Upper St. Clair High School (USCHS) is a public secondary school in Upper St. Clair, Pennsylvania and the sole high school within the township's namesake school district. Serving students in grades 9–12, USCHS is one of three secondary schools in Pennsylvania to be recognized as a Blue Ribbon School three times.

History
Upper St. Clair High School traces its earliest heritage to the late 18th century Higbee School, a one-room log cabin which was the first known school in the area. The first school west of the Alleghenies, Higbee was located on the northeast border of present Upper St. Clair, just south of the current site of the school. .

Upper St. Clair High School was established in 1957, with the creation of a tenth grade class.  Prior to 1957, Upper St. Clair students completing the ninth grade at Ft. Couch School were then enrolled as transfer students at neighboring high schools, primarily Mt. Lebanon, with Upper St. Clair Township paying their tuition as out-of-jurisdiction students.  When Mt. Lebanon High School, due to crowded conditions, decided to no longer accept Upper St. Clair students, the Upper St. Clair School Board voted to create a high school.  Dr. Carl Streams was recruited from Mt. Lebanon to become the new Supervising Principal, and he in turn recruited a high school faculty.  One grade was added to Ft. Couch School each year from 1957 through September 1959, when the first high school senior class was enrolled.  The inaugural class graduated in June 1960, and numbered 74 students, with most continuing on to college.  The Class of 1960 created many of the traditions and artifacts for the high school, including the school colors, alma mater, mascot, yearbook, and school newspaper.

Concurrently, a new high school building was constructed at the northwest corner of the intersection of McLaughlin Run and Washington Roads, where formerly the Clifton School had been located.  The Class of 1962 graduated from this new building, although they had not attended classes there.  With the completion of a new high school building, Ft. Couch School reverted to its earlier status as a junior high school, then a middle school.

During Dr. William Pope's tenure as district superintendent, Upper St. Clair High School was substantially remodeled in 2000. The renovations included replacements of much of the school's aging building; the mechanical systems; and allowed for many technological advancements such as widespread Internet access.  The renovations improved the facilities, allowing for a professional-sized theater, two full-sized gymnasiums, a weight room, and a racquetball court. Academic facilities were also improved with a  library at the center of the academic wing. The library was dedicated to Dr. Pope in 2003 upon his retirement.

Beginning around 2015, the school district began implementing a 1:1 iPad program for middle school students and later introduced Chromebooks to both the middle schools and the high school. The high school implemented Securly web filtering and also opened a Square-powered online store for students to purchase additional accessories. Then-technology director Ray Berrot stated that the estimated cost of the program was $136,400 per year.

In 2018, USCSD broke ground on a rebuild of the high school's aquatic facility. The larger of the two new pools will house 8 lanes, and a separate smaller pool will be built to accommodate students with special needs. The aquatic facility was part of an overall $22,650,000 capital project program which simultaneously built new office space for the district near the Panther stadium and renovated Boyce Middle School's athletic facilities.

During the COVID-19 pandemic, Upper St. Clair High School through its district was the target of a class action suit regarding the masking policy implemented at schools. On January 10, the school board voted to drop its mask requirement and was subsequently sued by unnamed nparents and families in Doe v. Upper St. Clair School District, who allege the schools did not take into account high transmission rates. The suit, fought concurrently with a similar lawsuit targeting North Allegheny's schools, succeeded on January 22, and the mask policy was reimplemented the following Monday by order of federal judge William S. Stickman IV. However, Stickman's decision was overruled the following March by the Third Circuit Court of Appeals, as the lack of a high transmission rate mooted the primary complaint of the suit.

Academics

USCHS students may choose to enroll in Advanced Placement (AP) courses to experience college-level academics and potentially earn college credit for passing AP exams. As of 2023, USCHS has 52% of all students pass at least one AP Exam, with 57% enrolled in AP. This is a decline from a 2009 report found that 62.9% of 12th graders enrolled in at least one Advanced Placement (AP) course, with 88.9% of those students passing at least one AP exam. 

The school also offers an International Baccalaureate (IB) program, offering all three levels of IB. A 2009 report found that 21.7% of 12th graders had taken and passed at least one IB test. Among participants in the IB program, 84.6% passed at least one IB test. Of the entire 12th grade class surveyed, 3.3% earned an IB diploma.

In standardized testing, Upper St. Clair is well above the state average when it comes to proficiency. 89% of all USCHS students are proficient in Mathematics, 92% are proficient in science, and 96% are proficient in reading. Compared to the rest of the state of Pennsylvania, the school ranks between 26 to 32 percentage points in each of the three areas measured.

The school and district have adopted a policy of not ranking its students. As of 2021, the school has enrolled 1,391 students in its halls, and the high school has a graduation rate of 99%.

Upper St. Clair is also known for its debate team. In 2021, the team ranked as the 38th best in the nation out of 3000 schools by the National Speech and Debate Association; the school improved its rank to 36th in 2022. The Association accredits USC's debate program as among the most prestigious in the nation, and the team additionally the Pennsylvania High School Speech League State Championship in 2022.

IB removal controversy 
An academic controversy during the 2005–2006 school year was the elimination of the International Baccalaureate (IB) program. Members of the new school board elected in 2005 criticized the program as being too costly, a needless duplication of Advanced Placement, and a proponent of "socialist" values. In February 2006 the new school board voted 5–4 to phase out the IB program over two years, allowing only current 11th and 12th grade students to complete requirements. In March 2006, the ACLU filed a lawsuit and an out-of-court settlement was reached in May 2006 with two main stipulations. First, the program was reinstated for a minimum of two years. Second, a nine-month study to determine the value of the IB program was conducted as part of the settlement agreement. The study resulted in a recommendation to retain the IB curriculum.

Athletics 
Upper St. Clair High School competes in the PIAA's District 7, commonly referred to as the WPIAL. Sports at St. Clair affiliated with WPIAL include baseball, basketball, cross country, field hockey, football, golf, lacrosse, rifle, soccer, softball, swimming, tennis, track, volleyball, and wrestling, as well as non-WPIAL cheerleading, crew, fencing, and ice hockey. Club teams are usually called the Upper St. Clair Panthers, with the mascot being a black panther. These teams are supported on the campus of the high school Athletic facilities at consisting of two gyms, two indoor swimming pools, and a football stadium surrounding by a track.

The 1989 football team won the WPIAL Quad A Championship and the PA Quad A State Championship, finished with a 15–0 record and No. 4 final ranking in the USA Today Super 25 national rankings. The 2006 football team won the PA Quad A State Championship, finishing with an undefeated 16–0 record, and were ranked in the top-ten nationally, in several polls. The school's football coach for 39 seasons, Jim Render, is the winningest football coach in WPIAL history; he was succeeded by Mike Junko in 2018.

The high school's girls' soccer team has won a single championship in 2015, scoring two goals against Central Bucks High School East. In boys' soccer, Upper St. Clair has won three PIAA championships. Its first two were back to back championships in 2004 and 2005; its most recent win was in 2022.

The school has had a long history in tennis, being a dominant team throughout the 1990s, though entering an 18-year WPIAL championship on the girls' team from 2003 to 2021 and an ongoing boys' championship drought since 2008. The girls' teams broke their drought in 2021, defeating Greater Latrobe Senior High School in a rematch of the 2020 championships.

PIAA Team Championships

WPIAL Team Championships

Arts

Music and theater 
The USCHS music program has three components: (1) choral courses, (2) instrumental courses, and (3) extra-curricular activities. The focus of courses is on performance rather than music theory or history.

Choral courses include Men's Ensemble, Women's choir, Clarion Choir, Pantheon Choir, and Chanteclair Choir, and can be elective or selective. Extra-curricular vocal ensembles include the Chanteclairs depending on student interest. Instrumental courses offerings include string and full orchestra, concert band, and jazz band.
 
The Panther Marching Band holds a two-week training program during the summer to help students prepare for football half-time performances and festivals. In addition, it rehearses after school during the first nine weeks of the school year. The band makes at least one trip each spring to perform at a major festival. In recent years, multiple USCHS students have been accepted into all-state instrumental music ensembles and choirs.

The Upper St. Clair Theater, renovated in 1999, hosts a fall play and spring musical every year, with students filling most of the cast and crew roles. Each March, USCHS students performthe  musical which has since become a community event, involving 30–40 student managers, 250 students in cast and supporting crew roles, an adult staff of 40 musical specialists, and a group of 100 adult volunteers called Theatre Angels. Students participate in a wide variety of capacities, including directing, acting, dancing, costume design, set construction, lighting, publicity, and playing in the pit orchestra.  Recent musicals performed are The Drowsy Chaperone (2017), Evita (2018), Hello, Dolly! (2019),  Shrek (2020),, Smokey Joe's Cafe (2021) and Seussical (2022).

Yearbook 
The yearbook for Upper St. Clair High School is titled the Clairvoyant, based on a contest held by the class of 1960. The school has contracted with M&M Photography, a local photography studio within the Pittsburgh area, for the exclusive rights to photograph yearbook group photos for USCHS. The school does not require students to use M&M for their individual portraits, though highly recommends using the studio.

Other arts 
The St. Clarion is the school's student newspaper. It usually produces four issues annually as well as a senior magazine issue. The paper is made during both journalism classes and by student volunteers. The paper writes on both world and campus news, detailing many events from sports to school policy changes. The paper is funded by community advertisers as well as student fund-raising.

The Montage is the school's literary arts magazine produced by the student body. The Montage produces one issue per year, selling copies to the student body in May. The magazine publishes original poems, short stories, personal essays, artwork, photography, and musical compositions written by the students. A staff of 15–20 people compiles the submissions into the magazine. As with the St. Clarion, the Montage is funded by both community advertisers and student fund-raising. In 2014, that year's edition of Montage won the American Scholastic Association Contest.

Awards and rankings
Upper St. Clair High School is one of three secondary schools in Pennsylvania to have won the Blue Ribbon Award three times; the others being Fort Couch Middle School, which is also located in the Upper St. Clair School District, and neighboring rival Mt. Lebanon High School. In 2000, the United States Department of Education recognized USCHS as one of 27 New American High Schools. In 2008, Upper St. Clair High School ranked 216 in Newsweek's list of the 1,300 Top High Schools. USCHS ranked in the "silver medal" category in U.S. News & World Report's Best High Schools 2009 listing.
In 2012, for the 7th year in a row, Upper St. Clair school district was ranked the #1 best performing school district out of 105 school districts in the 7 county region around Pittsburgh by the Pittsburgh Business Times.

Notable alumni

Terry Babcock-Lumish – professor, economist, policymaker; founder of Islay Consulting LLC
Sean Casey – first baseman for Cincinnati Reds, member of team's Hall of Fame
Stephen Chbosky – author of The Perks of Being a Wallflower
Jeff Delaney - NFL defensive back
Kim Director – actress
Craig Dunaway – former football tight end for Pittsburgh Steelers
Tim Federle –  author, librettist, screenwriter, director, producer
Kirk Ferentz – University of Iowa head coach
Chuck Greenberg – sports attorney and baseball team owner
Todd Haley – former Cleveland Browns and Pittsburgh Steelers offensive coordinator, former Kansas City Chiefs head coach
Anthony Jeselnik – comedian
Sean Lee – retired linebacker with the Dallas Cowboys
Grant Lewis  – NHL ice hockey player
Jack Maitland – running back for Baltimore Colts and New England Patriots
Ryan Malone – hockey player for Tampa Bay Lightning, silver medalist with 2010 U.S. Olympic team
Kevin Orie – third baseman for Chicago Cubs
Dylan Reese – captain of Harvard Crimson hockey team, seventh-round draft pick by New York Rangers
Kevin Slowey – baseball player, second-round selection by Minnesota Twins in 2005
Doug Whaley – General Manager and Director of Pro Personnel for NFL's Buffalo Bills 2010–17

Notes

References

External links
 
 Theater website
 Athletics website
 2022-2023 Student Handbook

Schools in Allegheny County, Pennsylvania
Public high schools in Pennsylvania
Educational institutions established in 1957
1957 establishments in Pennsylvania